The 2000 Nabisco Championship was a women's professional golf tournament, held March 23–26 at Mission Hills Country Club in Rancho Mirage, California. This was the 29th edition of the Kraft Nabisco Championship, and the eighteenth as a major championship.

Karrie Webb won the first of her two titles in this event, ten strokes ahead of Dottie Pepper, the defending   her second consecutive major win and the second of her seven major titles.
Webb held an eight-stroke lead after 54 holes, and shot a final round 70 for a comfortable victory.

Past champions in the field

Made the cut

Source:

Missed the cut

Source:

Final leaderboard
Sunday, March 26, 2000

(a) - denotes amateur

References

External links
Golf Observer leaderboard

Chevron Championship
Golf in California
Nabisco Championship
Nabisco Championship
Nabisco Championship
Nabisco Championship
Women's sports in California